Acacia prominens (golden rain wattle, goldenrain wattle, Gosford wattle or grey sally) is a shrub or tree in the genus Acacia native to New South Wales, Australia.

Description
It has glabrous branchlets that are angled at the extremeties and has smooth grey coloured bark. Like most species of Acacia it has phyllodes rather than true leaves. The grey-green to grey-blue, glabrous to sparsely hairy phyllodes have a narrowly elliptic to narrowly oblong-elliptic shape and are more or less straight. It blooms between July and September producing inflorescences in groups of 5 to 25 in an axillay raceme with spherical flower-heads that have a diameter of  containing 8 to 15 lemon yellow to pale yellow coloured flowers.

Taxonomy
The species was first formally described by the botanist Allan Cunningham in 1832 as part of George Dons work A General History of Dichlamydeous Plants. It was reclassified as Racosperma prominens by Leslie Pedley in 2003 then transferred back to genus Acacia in 2006.
It is most closely related to A. kettlewelliae and A. covenyi.

Distribution
It is endemic to south eastern Australia in New South Wales and also found in Victoria. In New South Wales it is found from around the Hunter Valley in the north west to the Gosford and Sydney areas in the south east. It is often situated in damp and sheltered areas growing in loamy and clay soils along the margins of rainforest or as a part of wet sclerophyll forest communities. It is naturalised to parts of central Victoria including the goldfields, greater Grampians, Gippsland Plain and northern inland slopes.

Alkaloids
It contains the psychoactive alkaloids phenethylamine and β-methylphenethylamine.

Image gallery

See also
List of Acacia species

References

External links

prominens
Flora of New South Wales
Shrubs
Flora of Victoria (Australia)
Taxa named by George Don
Taxa named by Allan Cunningham (botanist)
Plants described in 1832